Major General Alan Hawley  is a British doctor and academic. He was a medical officer in the British Army and served as Director General of the Army Medical Services from 2006 to 2009. He is currently Professor of Disaster Management at the University of Glamorgan.

Early life
Hawley studied at the University of Birmingham having attended Wednesfield Grammar School He graduated Bachelor of Medicine, Bachelor of Surgery (MB ChB). He completed his pre-registration house officer appointments at the Cambridge Military Hospital, Aldershot Garrison.

Military career
On 3 April 1977, Hawley was commissioned into the Territorial and Army Volunteer Reserve of the Prince of Wales' Division, British Army as a second lieutenant (on probation). He was given the service number 504232. He transferred to the Royal Army Medical Corps on 4 June 1978 as a second lieutenant (on probation) (medical cadetship).

References

Living people
Royal Army Medical Corps officers
21st-century British medical doctors
Academics of the University of Glamorgan
Alumni of the University of Birmingham
Year of birth missing (living people)
Place of birth missing (living people)
British Army major generals
Commanders of the Order of the British Empire
People educated at Wednesfield Grammar School